Thomas Michael Smyth (pronounced Smith) (born 19 December 1946 in Knockbridge, County Louth, Republic of Ireland) is an Irish soccer commentator. Since February 1993, he has been employed by ESPN in the United States, where his primary role is as color commentator and in-studio analyst for major soccer events. He also commentates on Gaelic games, horse racing, harness racing, and American football.

Career

Player
Smyth moved to the United States in 1963 following a brief football career with a local Irish team. In America, he played with the Shamrock Club in the German American Soccer League as well as for the Boston Beacons of the North American Soccer League.

Commentator
Early in his career, Smyth was a commentator for Gaelic sports at Gaelic Park in The Bronx, New York, including Gaelic football and hurling matches for the local leagues from U-12 up to senior level. He, at least once, made a comical remark in regards to the poor level of play in a UEFA Champions League game, saying "I've seen better games played at Gaelic Park in Riverdale."

Smyth was the voice of the MetroStars of Major League Soccer from the team's inception in 1996 to the early 2000s, when his ESPN contract prohibited him from working for the MSG Network.

Smyth was the color commentator for the Philadelphia Union between 2017 and 2021. Previously, he regularly covered ESPN International matches weekly for La Liga, Serie A, the FA Cup, and International matches and was one of the regular panelist on ESPNSoccernet PressPass which is hosted by Derek Rae. He also commentated matches from the UEFA Champions League coverage on ESPN networks outside the United States. In 2007, he joined ESPN's MLS broadcast team and had also done a few World Cups for ESPN, including 2006, where he partnered with Adrian Healey. He commentated on the UEFA Highlight show on Thursdays and Fridays. Mr. Smyth would occasionally be a phone-in guest pundit mostly during the UEFA Champions League campaigns on the CSRN radio program, The 2 G's, sharing his opinion regarding the upcoming matches.

During ESPN's coverage of Euro 2008, Smyth shared commentary duties with Andy Gray, the two of them generally alternating matches. Smyth was an ESPN analyst for the 2010 World Cup, and has become an outspoken proponent of instant replay.

Smyth became a part of Amazon Video's NFL Thursday Night Football UK broadcast team in 2017, alongside Derek Rae.

Radio host
Currently, Tommy Smyth cohosts a show with Rodney Marsh called "Grumpy Pundits" on SiriusXM FC, Channel 157. He is also a "Soccer Management and Scouting" instructor for the online sports-career training school Sports Management Worldwide, founded and run by Dr. Lynn Lashbrook.

St Patrick's Day Parade
Smyth was the 2008 Grand Marshal of the 247th St. Patrick's Day Parade in New York City. He has been the co-host for WNBC coverage of the New York City's St. Patrick's Day Parade since 1998.

Style
Smyth is known for signing off when commentating as "Tommy Smyth... with a Y," and for his description of a ball flying into the net when a goal is scored as "a bulge in the old onion bag". He also is known for saying "a peach of a goal."

References

External links
Tommy Smyth on ESPN
BME Talk Podcast interview

1946 births
Living people
American horse racing announcers
Irish association football commentators
Gaelic games commentators
German-American Soccer League players
Sportspeople from County Louth
Republic of Ireland association footballers
Major League Soccer broadcasters
Association footballers not categorized by position